James Michael Furyk (born May 12, 1970) is an American professional golfer who plays on the PGA Tour and the PGA Tour Champions. In 2010, he was the FedEx Cup champion and PGA Tour Player of the Year. He has won one major championship, the 2003 U.S. Open. Furyk holds the record for the lowest score in PGA Tour history, a round of 58 which he shot during the final round of the 2016 Travelers Championship, and has earned notoriety for his unorthodox golf swing.

In September 2006 he reached a career high of second in the Official World Golf Ranking. He ranked in the top-10 for over 440 weeks between 1999 and 2016.

Early life
James Michael Furyk was born on May 12, 1970, in West Chester, Pennsylvania. His ancestry is Czech and Polish on his mother's side and Ukrainian and Hungarian on his father's side. His father, Mike, was an assistant pro at the Edgmont Country Club and later also spent time as a pro at West Chester Golf and Country Club as well as Hidden Springs Golf Course in Horsham. His early years were spent in the Pittsburgh suburbs learning the game from his father, who was also head pro at Uniontown Country Club in Uniontown, Fayette County.

Furyk graduated from Manheim Township High School in Lancaster County in 1988, where he played basketball in addition to being a state champion golfer. He played his junior golf at Meadia Heights Golf Club just south of Lancaster city. He played college golf at the University of Arizona in Tucson, where he was an All-American twice, and led the Wildcats to their first (and only) NCAA title in 1992.

Professional career

Furyk turned professional in 1992. He won the Nike Mississippi Gulf Coast Classic on the Nike Tour in 1993. He joined the PGA Tour in 1994 and won at least one tournament each year between 1998 and 2003. At the time, this was the second-best streak of winning seasons behind Tiger Woods and he made the top ten in the Official World Golf Ranking. Furyk's biggest win to date came on June 15, 2003, when he tied the record for the lowest 72-hole score in U.S. Open history to win his first major championship.

In 2004, he only played in fourteen events after missing three months due to surgery to repair cartilage damage in his wrist; he missed six cuts and his highest finish was T6, which caused him to fall out of the top hundred on the money list. He returned to good form in 2005 and regained his top ten ranking, winning a PGA Tour event in that year and two in 2006. In the 2006 season, he finished a career-high second on the money list and won the Vardon Trophy for the first time. He had 13 top-10 finishes, including nine top-3s, four second-place finishes, and two victories.

The 2010 season was a banner one for Furyk. After going more than two seasons winless, he won a career-best three tournaments on Tour in 2010: The Transitions Championship, the Verizon Heritage, and the season-ending Tour Championship. His victory in the Tour Championship also earned him the 2010 FedEx Cup after winning by one stroke. His accomplishments in 2010 won him both the PGA Player of the Year and PGA Tour Player of the Year for the first time.

Since 2012, Furyk has come close on several occasions to winning more titles. At the 2012 U.S. Open, Furyk led after 54 holes and was still the leader deep into the final day, before snap hooking his drive into the trees at the 16th which led to a bogey and was followed by another at the 18th. He finished in a tie for fourth, two strokes behind Webb Simpson. At the 2012 WGC-Bridgestone Invitational, Furyk led after the first three rounds and looked set to win the championship as he held a one-stroke lead going into the final hole, but a double-bogey cost him the title to Keegan Bradley.

At the 2013 PGA Championship, Furyk led by one stroke going into the final day over Jason Dufner, but this time his lead was overturned on the front nine and he was unable to reduce the deficit as Dufner won by two strokes. Furyk's caddy since 1999 has been Mike "Fluff" Cowan, who was Tiger Woods' caddy for Woods's first two years as a professional.

On September 13, 2013, Furyk shot a 12-under-par 59 in the second round of the BMW Championship at Conway Farms Golf Club in Lake Forest, Illinois, becoming just the sixth player to shoot 59 in a PGA Tour event.

In July 2014, Furyk held the 54-hole lead at the RBC Canadian Open, with a three stroke advantage over his nearest competitor Tim Clark. However Clark produced five birdies in his last eight holes to claim the title, after Furyk missed a 12 footer on the 18th green to force a playoff.

In February 2015, Furyk held a one shot lead at the AT&T Pebble Beach National Pro-Am going into the final round, but shot a two over round of 74 to finish six strokes behind Brandt Snedeker. Furyk's round was the worst of any player to finish within the top 50 on the final day. Since Furyk's last victory at The Tour Championship in 2010, he is 0-for-9 with a lead/co-lead after 54 holes. On April 19, 2015, Furyk ended the long slump when he defeated Kevin Kisner with birdie on the second playoff hole at the RBC Heritage. The victory was his second at the event and his 17th victory on the PGA Tour.

In 2015, at the BMW Championship, Furyk withdrew with a wrist injury. This was his first withdrawal since 1995, it also came at the same course he had shot a 59 two years before. Furyk qualified for the 2015 Presidents Cup team but could not play due to the same injury and instead became an assistant captain. J. B. Holmes replaced him on the team.

Furyk missed the early part of the 2016 season after under-going wrist surgery. This caused him to miss the 2016 Masters Tournament and brought to end a run of 47 consecutive major championship appearances. In June 2016, at the 2016 U.S. Open, Furyk finished in a tie for second, three shots behind Dustin Johnson at one under par. He shot a four-under round of 66 in the final round to vault up the leaderboard. This was the third time during his career Furyk had been runner-up at the U.S. Open.

On August 7, 2016, Furyk shot a 12-under-par 58 in the final round of the Travelers Championship at TPC at River Highlands in Cromwell, Connecticut, becoming the first player to shoot 58 in a PGA Tour event. This also made Furyk the first PGA Tour pro to card two rounds under 60.

On January 11, 2017, Furyk was named as the United States Ryder Cup captain for 2018. At the 2018 Ryder Cup, the U.S. lost to the Europe team by 17½ points to 10½ at Le Golf National in France. Following the matches, Furyk was subject to criticism from Masters champion Patrick Reed. Reed criticized Furyk's manner of making pairings and, more specifically, his decision to break up the previously successful Reed-Jordan Spieth pairing.

The 2017–18 season was the first time Furyk was not fully exempt on the PGA Tour, playing the season with only past champion status. He started the 2018–19 season out of the 126–150 category.

On March 17, 2019, Furyk finished second in The Players Championship, one stroke behind Rory McIlroy. It was a welcome result for 48-year-old Furyk, who barely qualified for the tournament and who had struggled with injury and poor play in 2017 and 2018.

PGA Tour Champions (2020–present)
On August 2, 2020, Furyk made his debut on the PGA Tour Champions, after having turned 50 years old in May 2020. He won The Ally Challenge in his first start on the tour.

In his second start on the PGA Tour Champions, on September 20, 2020, Furyk won the PURE Insurance Championship at Pebble Beach Golf Links in a playoff over Jerry Kelly. He joined Arnold Palmer and Bruce Fleisher as the only golfers to win their first two starts on tour.

In July 2021, Furyk won his first senior major tournament, the U.S. Senior Open at Omaha Country Club. Furyk defeated Mike Weir and Retief Goosen by three strokes. The win automatically qualifies him for the 2022 U.S. Open.

Swing
As Mike Furyk describes in a Golf Digest issue in 2001, Jim Furyk's hips "underturn" during the backswing and "overturn" coming down. On the downswing, he draws the club in a large arc behind his body (viewing from his right hand side), then pastes his elbow against his right hip at impact. David Feherty described Furyk's swing as "an octopus falling out of a tree". Gary McCord said that it evokes the image of "a one-armed golfer using an axe to kill a snake in a telephone booth."

Personal life
Furyk is married to his wife Tabitha, and they have two children. He owns homes in the Kapalua Resort and in Ponte Vedra Beach.

Professional wins (29)

PGA Tour wins (17)

PGA Tour playoff record (4–8)

Sunshine Tour wins (1)

Nike Tour wins (1)

Nike Tour playoff record (1–1)

South American Tour wins (1)

Other wins (6)

Other playoff record (2–1)

PGA Tour Champions wins (3)

PGA Tour Champions playoff record (1–0)

Major championships

Wins (1)

Results timeline
Results not in chronological order in 2020.

CUT = missed the half-way cut
"T" indicates a tie for a place
NT = No tournament due to COVID-19 pandemic

Summary

Most consecutive cuts made – 13 (1994 U.S. Open – 1998 Open Championship)
Longest streak of top-10s – 4 (1997 U.S. Open – 1998 Masters)

Results in The Players Championship

CUT = missed the halfway cut
"T" indicates a tie for a place

Results in World Golf Championships
Results not in chronological order before 2015.

1Cancelled due to 9/11

QF, R16, R32, R64 = Round in which player lost in match play
"T" = Tied
NT = No tournament
Note that the HSBC Champions did not become a WGC event until 2009.

Senior major championships

Wins (1)

Results timeline

"T" indicates a tie for a place

PGA Tour career summary

*As of the 2020 season.

U.S. national team appearances
Professional
Ryder Cup: 1997, 1999 (winners), 2002, 2004, 2006, 2008 (winners), 2010, 2012, 2014, 2018 (non-playing captain)
Presidents Cup: 1998, 2000 (winners), 2003 (tie), 2005 (winners), 2007 (winners), 2009 (winners), 2011 (winners)
Presidents Cup record W–L–H: 20–10–3
World Cup: 2003
Wendy's 3-Tour Challenge (representing PGA Tour): 2002 (winners)

See also
1993 PGA Tour Qualifying School graduates
List of golfers with most PGA Tour wins
Lowest rounds of golf

References

External links

Site featuring Jim's instructional Short Game video
 

American male golfers
Arizona Wildcats men's golfers
PGA Tour golfers
PGA Tour Champions golfers
Winners of men's major golf championships
Winners of senior major golf championships
Ryder Cup competitors for the United States
Golfers from Pennsylvania
Golfers from Florida
Sportspeople from Chester County, Pennsylvania
People from Ponte Vedra Beach, Florida
American people of Czech descent
American people of Hungarian descent
American people of Polish descent
American people of Ukrainian descent
1970 births
Living people